Events from the year 1951 in Michigan.

Top stories
The Associated Press polled more than 50 editors of its member newspapers in Michigan and ranked the state's top news stories of 1953 as follows:
 The April 18 death of U.S. Senator Arthur Vandenberg (369 points)
 The February 8 state office building fire in Lansing set by arsonist Richard Shay (304 points)
 The Ann Arbor murder of nurse Pauline Campbell by three teenagers seeking beer money (198 points)
 The February 8 hearing of the Kefauver Committee examining Detroit's underworld (154 points)
 The arrest, trial and conviction of farm youths Valorus Mattheis and Raymond Lee Olson for the 1950 murder of coed Caroline Drown near Kalamazoo (152 points)
 The 1951 Michigan State Spartans football team (126 points)
 An automobile crash near Pontiac killed Mr. and Mrs. Murray Moore, parents of 11 children (113 points)
 Crime rampage of by Warren Lee Irwin following a murder near Oxford, Michigan (108 points)
 Tie for ninth place (each story receiving 91 points) between:
 * July 9 death of Detroit Tigers' great Harry Heilmann
 * Michigan Legislature's increase in the gasoline tax

Office holders

State office holders

 Governor of Michigan: G. Mennen Williams (Democrat)
 Lieutenant Governor of Michigan: John W. Connolly (Democrat)/William C. Vandenberg (Republican)
 Michigan Attorney General: Stephen John Roth/Frank Millard (Republican)
 Michigan Secretary of State: Frederick M. Alger Jr. (Republican)
 Speaker of the Michigan House of Representatives: Victor A. Knox (Republican)
 Chief Justice, Michigan Supreme Court:

Mayors of major cities

 Mayor of Detroit: Albert Cobo (Republican)
 Mayor of Grand Rapids: Paul G. Goebel
 Mayor of Flint: Paul Lovegrove
 Mayor of Saginaw: Edwin W. Koepke/William R. Hart
 Mayor of Dearborn: Orville L. Hubbard
 Mayor of Lansing: Ralph Crego
 Mayor of Ann Arbor: William E. Brown Jr.

Federal office holders
 U.S. Senator from Michigan: Homer S. Ferguson (Republican)
 U.S. Senator from Michigan: Arthur Vandenberg (Republican)/Blair Moody (Democrat)
 House District 1: Thaddeus M. Machrowicz (Democrat)
 House District 2: George Meader (Republican)
 House District 3: Paul W. Shafer (Republican)
 House District 4: Clare Hoffman (Republican)
 House District 5: Gerald Ford (Republican)
 House District 6: William W. Blackney (Republican)
 House District 7: Jesse P. Wolcott (Republican)
 House District 8: Fred L. Crawford (Republican)
 House District 9: Ruth Thompson (Republican)
 House District 10: Roy O. Woodruff (Republican)
 House District 11: Charles E. Potter (Republican)
 House District 12: John B. Bennett (Republican)
 House District 13: George D. O'Brien (Democrat)
 House District 14: Louis C. Rabaut (Democrat)
 House District 15: John Dingell Sr. (Democrat)
 House District 16: John Lesinski Jr. (Democrat)
 House District 17: George Anthony Dondero (Republican)

Population

Sports

Baseball

 1951 Detroit Tigers season – Under managers Red Rolfe, the Tigers compiled a 73–81 record and finished in fifth place in the American League. The team's statistical leaders included George Kell with a .319 batting average, Vic Wertz with 27 home runs and 94 RBIs, Virgil Trucks with 13 wins, and Fred Hutchinson with a 3.68 earned run average.
 1951 Michigan Wolverines baseball season - Under head coach Ray Fisher, the Wolverines compiled a 13–10 record. Leo Koceski was the team captain.

American football

 1951 Detroit Lions season – Under head coach Buddy Parker, the Lions compiled a 7–4–1 record and finished in second place in the NFL National Division. The team's statistical leaders included Bobby Layne with 2,403 passing yards, Robert Hoernschemeyer with 678 rushing yards, Dorne Dibble with 613 receiving yards, and Doak Walker with 97 points scored (6 touchdowns, 43 extra points, 6 field goals).
 1951 Michigan State Spartans football team – Under head coach Biggie Munn, the Spartans compiled a 9–0 record and were ranked No. 2 in the final AP Poll. 
 1951 Michigan Wolverines football team – Under head coach Bennie Oosterbaan, the Wolverines finished in fourth place in the Big Ten Conference with a record of 4–5.
 1951 Central Michigan Chippewas football team – Under head coach Kenneth "Bill" Kelly, the Chippewas compiled a 5–3 record. 
 1951 Detroit Titans football team – The Titans compiled a 4–7 record under head coach Dutch Clark.
 1951 Michigan State Normal Hurons football team – Under head coach Harry Ockerman, the Hurons compiled a 4–5 record.
 1951 Western Michigan Broncos football team – Under head coach John Gill, the Broncos compiled a 4–4 record.

Basketball
 1950–51 Michigan Wolverines men's basketball team – Under head coach Ernie McCoy, the Wolverines compiled a 7–15  record. Leo VanderKuy was the team's leading scorer with 329 points in 22 games for an average of 15.0 points per game.
 1950–51 Michigan State Spartans men's basketball team – Under head coach Pete Newell, the Spartans compiled a 10–11 record.
 1950–51 Detroit Titans men's basketball team – The Titans compiled a 17–14 record under head coach Bob Calihan.
 1950–51 Western Michigan Broncos men's basketball team – Under head coach William Perigo, the Broncos compiled a 13–9 record.

Ice hockey

 1950–51 Detroit Red Wings season – Under head coach Tommy Ivan, the Red Wings compiled a 44–13–13 record, finished in first place in the National Hockey League, and lost to the Montreal Canadiens in the semi-finals of the playoffs. Gordie Howe led the team with 43 goals, 43 assists, and 86 points. The team's goaltender was Terry Sawchuk.  
 1950–51 Michigan Wolverines men's ice hockey season – Under head coach Vic Heyliger, the team compiled a 22–4–1 record and won the 1951 NCAA Division I Men's Ice Hockey Tournament, the Wolverines' first of three consecutive NCAA hockey championships.
 1950–51 Michigan State Spartans men's ice hockey team – Under head coach Harold Paulsen, the Spartans compiled a 6–11 record.
 1950–51 Michigan Tech Huskies men's ice hockey team – Under head coach Al Renfrew, Michigan Tech compiled a 5–14–2 record.

Boat racing
 Port Huron to Mackinac Boat Race – 
 APBA Gold Cup –

Golfing
 Michigan Open – 
 Motor City Open -

Other

Chronology of events

January
 January 3 - The first African-American woman to be elected to the Michigan Legislature, Charline White, was sworn into the office.

February

March

April

May

June

July

August

September

October

November

December

Births 
 January 22 - Leon Roberts, Major League Baseball outfielder (1974–1984), in Vicksburg, Michigan
 January 28 - Bob Sutton, head football coach at Army (1991-1999), in Ypsilanti, Michigan
 March 16 - Joe DeLamielleure, NFL offensive lineman (1973-1985) inducted into Pro Football Hall of Fame, in Detroit
 April 8 - Mel Schacher, bassist for Grand Funk Railroad, in Flint, Michigan
 May 5 - John D. Cherry, 62nd Lieutenant Governor of Michigan, in Sulphur Springs, Texas
 September 10 - Gary Danielson, NFL quarterback (1976-1988), in Detroit
 September 18 - Ben Carson, neurosurgeon, 17th United States Secretary of Housing and Urban Development, in Detroit
 October 18 - Pam Dawber, actress (Mork & Mindy, My Sister Sam), in Detroit

Gallery of 1951 births

Deaths
 April 13 - Wish Egan, baseball player and scout, at age 69 in Detroit
 April 18 - Arthur Vandenberg, U.S. Senator (1928-1951), at age 67 in Grand Rapids, Michigan

Gallery of 1951 deaths

See also
 History of Michigan
 History of Detroit

References